The Momentum Party is an unregistered centrist New Zealand political party founded by Gaurav Sharma on , following his expulsion from the Labour Party caucus. It contested the 2022 Hamilton West by-election, receiving 8.03% of the vote and coming fourth.

History

Founding 

On , Labour Party MP Gaurav Sharma alleged in an opinion piece for the New Zealand Herald that there was widespread bullying within Parliament, including specific allegations aimed at party whips, leadership, and the Parliamentary Service. In response, Parliamentary Service chief executive Rafael Gonzalez-Montero defended the organisation, saying that it "cannot direct MPs what to do and how to act". The party held a Zoom meeting for all its MPs except Sharma that evening. The following day, Sharma discovered that the meeting had taken place and refused to attend the caucus meeting, as his fate was "pre-determined". In the caucus meeting, Sharma was suspended from the Labour Party caucus. On , Ardern confirmed that Sharma had been expelled from the caucus.

On , Gaurav Sharma announced he had resigned from Parliament and was going to contest the following by-election. He also announced his intention to start a new centrist party. On , Sharma revealed his new centrist party, the Momentum Party, and stated that most of his campaign team from Labour had joined him as well.

Elections

2022 Hamilton West by-election 

In the 2022 Hamilton West by-election, Sharma, running for the Momentum Party, received 8.03% of the vote, coming fourth.

References 

2022 establishments in New Zealand
Centrist parties in New Zealand
Political parties established in 2022